Artur Siódmiak (born 7 October 1975) is a retired Polish team handball player, who was playing on the Poland men's national handball team.

He received a silver medal with the Polish team at the 2007 World Men's Handball Championship and a bronze medal at the 2009 World Men's Handball Championship. He participated at the 2008 Summer Olympics, where Poland finished 5th.

At the 2009 World Men's Handball Championship held in Croatia, he became a hero when scored a long range effort just 4 seconds before the final whistle in  the quarterfinal match between Poland and Norway, where Poles won.

References

External links

1975 births
Living people
Polish male handball players
Olympic handball players of Poland
People from Wągrowiec
Sportspeople from Greater Poland Voivodeship
TuS Nettelstedt-Lübbecke players